Brunoise is a culinary knife cut in which the food item is first julienned and then turned a quarter turn and diced, producing cubes of about  or less on each side. In France, a "brunoise" cut is a smaller 1 to 2 mm. Some typical vegetables for a brunoise are carrots, celery, leeks, and turnips. The diced vegetables are blanched briefly in salty boiling water and then submerged in salted ice water for a few seconds to set the color. The brunoise is used as a garnish in many dishes; it is often used to garnish consommé. A brunoise should be consistent in size and shape, as this helps to create a pleasing and professional presentation.

A brunoise cut is also used in stocks and soups to rapidly increase the rate that flavours and aromas are transferred to the surrounding liquid. This is due to the increase in surface area over a traditional chopping method and is preferred for recipes that do not benefit from the texture of chopped vegetables.

References

External links
 How to Dice and Brunoise – video

Cutting techniques (cooking)
Culinary terminology